Goliath is an album by Danish band Kellermensch, released on 27 January 2017.

Singles
On 18 November 2016, the band released the first single off the album "Bad Sign", with a lyric video released on the same day. It is notable that this is the first piece of new material since the release of the "Narcissus EP" in 2010. On 20 January 2017, the single "The Pain of Salvation" was released.

Track listing

Personnel

Kellermensch
Sebastian Wolff – Vocals, guitar
Anders Trans – Drums
Christian Sinderman – Vocals, organ
Jan V. Laursen – Guitar
Claudio W. Suez – Bass
John V. Laursen – Upright bass, guitar

Additional musicians
Søren Storm – Violins on tracks 2, 3, 4, 5, 6, 7, 8 & 10
Nils Gröndahl – Violins on tracks 1, 4, 5 & 9
Inger Juhl Jensen – Cello on tracks 1 & 4

Production
Sebastian & Kellermensch – Production & recording
Sebastian Wolff – Mixing
Jan Eliason – Mastering
Jan V. Laursen – Photography

Charts

References

2017 albums